Eucamptognathus is a genus of beetles in the family Carabidae, containing the following species:

 Eucamptognathus africanus (Castelnau, 1835)
 Eucamptognathus alluaudi Fairmaire, 1895
 Eucamptognathus andriai Deuve, 1982
 Eucamptognathus andringitricus Deuve, 1982
 Eucamptognathus androyanus Tschitscherine, 1903
 Eucamptognathus aterrimus Mateu, 1958
 Eucamptognathus badeni (Putzeys, 1877)
 Eucamptognathus bastardi Jeannel, 1948
 Eucamptognathus betsileus Jeannel, 1948
 Eucamptognathus boucardi (Tschitscherine, 1890)
 Eucamptognathus bouvieri Tschitscherine, 1900
 Eucamptognathus brevicornis (Fairmaire, 1869)
 Eucamptognathus catalai Jeannel, 1948
 Eucamptognathus chaudoirii (Fairmaire, 1868)
 Eucamptognathus colasi Deuve, 1982
 Eucamptognathus conspicuus Mateu, 1958
 Eucamptognathus costatus Mateu, 1958
 Eucamptognathus crassus Jeannel, 1948
 Eucamptognathus curvicrus Tschitscherine, 1898
 Eucamptognathus decaryi Jeannel, 1948
 Eucamptognathus diacritus (Alluaud, 1913)
 Eucamptognathus dieganus Alluaud, 1897
 Eucamptognathus diversus Chaudoir, 1874
 Eucamptognathus dostojewskii (Tschitscherine, 1897)
 Eucamptognathus emarginatus (Putzeys, 1877)
 Eucamptognathus erinnys (Tschitscherine, 1893)
 Eucamptognathus extremus Jeannel, 1955
 Eucamptognathus fairmairei Alluaud, 1926
 Eucamptognathus foveatus Jeannel, 1948
 Eucamptognathus freyi Straneo, 1960
 Eucamptognathus gigas (Basilewsky, 1967)
 Eucamptognathus granulifer Tschitscherine, 1900
 Eucamptognathus griveaudi (Basilewsky, 1967)
 Eucamptognathus haplosternus (Fairmaire, 1869)
 Eucamptognathus howa Tschitscherine, 1899
 Eucamptognathus ikopae Tschitscherine, 1900
 Eucamptognathus insolitus Mateu, 1958
 Eucamptognathus jeanneli Basilewsky, 1946
 Eucamptognathus laevipennis Jeannel, 1948
 Eucamptognathus lafertei Chevrolat, 1839
 Eucamptognathus lambertoni Alluaud, 1926
 Eucamptognathus lesnei Tschitscherine, 1900
 Eucamptognathus macrocephalus Deuve, 1981
 Eucamptognathus madagascariensis Mateu, 1958
 Eucamptognathus madecassus Mateu, 1958
 Eucamptognathus mananarensis Deuve, 1982
 Eucamptognathus mananjaryanus Mateu, 1958
 Eucamptognathus marovoayensis Deuve, 1981
 Eucamptognathus mateui Straneo, 1960
 Eucamptognathus mediocris Mateu, 1958
 Eucamptognathus minor (Harold, 1879)
 Eucamptognathus modestus Tschitscherine, 1903
 Eucamptognathus moerens Tschitscherine, 1903
 Eucamptognathus neoleptus Alluaud, 1926
 Eucamptognathus nigriceps Jeannel, 1948
 Eucamptognathus notabilis Mateu, 1958
 Eucamptognathus obtusiangulus Jeannel, 1948
 Eucamptognathus oopterus Tschitscherine, 1898
 Eucamptognathus opacus (Fairmaire, 1892)
 Eucamptognathus parallelus Deuve, 1986
 Eucamptognathus parapunctatipennis Mateu, 1958
 Eucamptognathus parvulus Deuve, 1981
 Eucamptognathus pauliani Mateu, 1958
 Eucamptognathus perichrysis Jeannel, 1948
 Eucamptognathus pernix Deuve, 1981
 Eucamptognathus perrieri Jeannel, 1948
 Eucamptognathus planatus Jeannel, 1948
 Eucamptognathus planipennis Deuve, 1986
 Eucamptognathus porphyrus Alluaud, 1926
 Eucamptognathus prasinus Alluaud, 1897
 Eucamptognathus pseudoboucardi Mateu, 1958
 Eucamptognathus pseudojeanneli Deuve, 1986
 Eucamptognathus pseudomadecassus Deuve, 1986
 Eucamptognathus psilonyx Alluaud, 1926
 Eucamptognathus punctatipennis Jeannel, 1948
 Eucamptognathus rutilans Jeannel, 1948
 Eucamptognathus satelles Tschitscherine, 1903
 Eucamptognathus septentrionalis Jeannel, 1948
 Eucamptognathus seyrigi Jeannel, 1948
 Eucamptognathus sicardi Alluaud, 1932
 Eucamptognathus sinuatus Jeannel, 1948
 Eucamptognathus sogai Deuve, 1986
 Eucamptognathus spectabilis (Castelnau, 1835)
 Eucamptognathus spernax Tschitscherine, 1903
 Eucamptognathus subiridescens (Basilewsky, 1967)
 Eucamptognathus subviolaceus Tschitscherine, 1898
 Eucamptognathus tenuistriatus Fairmaire, 1895
 Eucamptognathus thoracicus Alluaud, 1932
 Eucamptognathus toulgoeti Deuve, 1986
 Eucamptognathus tristis Deuve, 1981
 Eucamptognathus trisulcatus (Bates, 1879)
 Eucamptognathus tsaratananae Jeannel, 1948
 Eucamptognathus tshitsherini Alluaud, 1916
 Eucamptognathus vadoni Jeannel, 1948
 Eucamptognathus vadonianus Deuve, 1982
 Eucamptognathus viettei Deuve, 1981
 Eucamptognathus villiersi Mateu, 1958
 Eucamptognathus violaceus Jeannel, 1948
 Eucamptognathus viridanus Mateu, 1958

References

 
Pterostichinae